The 1995 Wisconsin Badgers men's soccer team represented the University of Wisconsin–Madison during the 1995 NCAA Division I men's soccer season and the 1995 Big Ten Conference men's soccer season. It was the program's 19th season of existence and their 19th season in NCAA Division I and the Big Ten Conference.

The 1995 season saw the Badgers win their first, and to date, only national championship. Played in front of the second-largest NCAA soccer crowd in history, Wisconsin beat Duke to win the 1995 NCAA Division I Men's Soccer Championship. Additionally, the Badgers were, along with Indiana, co-champions of the 1995 Big Ten Conference Men's Soccer Tournament. Wisconsin would not win the title again until 2017.

On October 13, 1995, the Badgers had their highest crowd in program history. 2,470 people attended their 2–0 win against Indiana.

Roster

Schedule 

|-
!colspan=6 style=""| Regular season
|-

|-
!colspan=6 style=""| Big Ten Tournament
|-

|-
!colspan=6 style=""| NCAA Tournament
|-

|-

|-

|-

Honors and awards 
The following players earned a postseason award.

National awards 

 NSCAA All-Americans
 Scott Lamphear (First-Team All-American)
  Mike Gentile (Third-Team All-American)
 NSCAA Coach of the Year Award
 Jim Launder

Regional awards 

 NSCAA All-Midwest Region
 Mike Gentile
 Scott Lamphear
 Travis Roy
 CoSIDA Academic All Region
 Scott Lamphear (First-Team)
 Josh Provan (Second-Team)
 Alastair Steel (Second-Team)

Conference awards 

 Big Ten Coach of the Year Award
 Jim Launder
 All-Big Ten First Team
 Mike Gentile 
 Scott Lamphear
 Travis Roy
 All-Big Ten Second Team
 Lars Hansen
 Josh Provan
 Alastair Steel
 Big Ten Player of the Week
 Bryan Grimm, week of Nov. 7, 1995
 Scott Lamphear, week of Oct. 10, 1995
 Big Ten All-Academic Team
 Christian Broadhurst
 Brian Doherty
 Lars Hansen
 Shea Huston
 Ryan Kehoe
 Blaze Konkol
 Scott Lamphear
 Josh Provan
 Alastair Steel
 Andrew Steele
 Big Ten Medal of Honor
 Jeff Gold

Team Awards 

 Team MVP
 Scott Lamphear
 Outstanding Freshman
 Doug Watson
 Athletic Board Scholar
 Ryan Kehoe (Zoology)

MLS Draft 
The following members of 1995 Wisconsin Badgers men's soccer team were selected in the 1996 MLS College Draft.

References

External links 
 UW Soccer

Wisconsin Badgers men's soccer seasons
Wisconsin
1995 in sports in Wisconsin
NCAA Division I Men's Soccer Tournament-winning seasons
NCAA Division I Men's Soccer Tournament College Cup seasons
Wisconsin
Wisconsin
Big Ten Conference men's soccer champion seasons